Åke Jönsson (26 June 1925 – 18 December 1998) was a Swedish footballer who played as a midfielder. He made eleven appearances for the Sweden national team from 1951 to 1957. He was also part of Sweden's squad for the football tournament at the 1952 Summer Olympics, but he did not play in any matches.

References

External links
 

1925 births
1998 deaths
Swedish footballers
Association football midfielders
Sweden international footballers
Helsingborgs IF players
Place of birth missing